Kumaka may refer to:

Kumaka, Barima-Waini, a village in northern Guyana, near the Atlantic coast
Kumaka, East Berbice-Corentyne, a village in East Berbice-Corentyne, eastern Guyana, on the upper Essequibo River
Kumaka Falls, a waterfall on the Essequibo River in Guyana